Aleyak (also Romanized as ‘Aleyak, Alīak, Ali Aq, and ‘Alīyak; also known as Alīk) is a village in Soleyman Rural District, Soleyman District, Zaveh County, Razavi Khorasan Province, Iran. At the 2006 census, its population was 1,513, in 372 families.

References 

Populated places in Zaveh County